Ray Braun (born March 6, 1936) is a former American football coach.  He served as the head football coach at the Montana State School of Mines—now known as Montana Tech of the University of Montana–for one season, in 1968, compiling a record of 2–6.  Before coming to Montana Tech, Braun was an assistant football coach at North Dakota State University and coached high school football at Hellgate High School in Missoula, Montana.  Braun was the defensive coordinator at Washington State University under head coach Jim Sweeney from 1972 to 1973.  He served two stints in the same capacity at Oregon State University, from 1976 to 1978 under Craig Fertig and 1982 to 1983 under Joe Avezzano.  Braun also coached in the professional ranks, as an assistant with the Portland Storm/Thunder  of the World Football League (WFL) from 1974 to 1975 and with the Cleveland Browns of the National Football League (NFL) in 1988.  During the 1990s he coached at a number of high schools in Oregon.

Head coaching record

College

References

1936 births
Living people
People from Dickinson, North Dakota
People from Dunn County, North Dakota
Coaches of American football from North Dakota
High school football coaches in Montana
Montana Tech Orediggers football coaches
North Dakota State Bison football coaches
South Dakota State Jackrabbits football coaches
Washington State Cougars football coaches
Portland Storm coaches
Portland Thunder (WFL) coaches
Oregon State Beavers football coaches
Colorado Buffaloes football coaches
Junior college football coaches in the United States
Cleveland Browns coaches
High school football coaches in Oregon